The 2021–22 season was the 120th season in the existence of US Quevilly-Rouen Métropole and the club's first season back in the second division of French football since 2018. In addition to the domestic league, Quevilly-Rouen participated in this season's edition of the Coupe de France.

Players

First-team squad

Transfers

Pre-season and friendlies

Competitions

Overall record

Ligue 2

League table

Results summary

Results by round

Matches
The league fixtures were announced on 25 June 2021.

Relegation play-offs

Coupe de France

References

US Quevilly-Rouen Métropole seasons
Quevilly-Rouen